In linear algebra, the  Frobenius  companion matrix of the monic polynomial

is the square matrix defined as

.

Some authors use the transpose of this matrix, which (dually) cycles coordinates, and is more convenient for some purposes, like linear recurrence relations.

Characterization

In this sense, the matrix   is the "companion" of the polynomial  .

If   is an n-by-n matrix with entries from some field , then the following statements are equivalent:

Not every square matrix is similar to a companion matrix. But every square matrix  is similar to a matrix made up of blocks of companion matrices. For details, see rational canonical form.

Diagonalizability
If  has distinct roots  (the eigenvalues of C(p)), then C(p) is diagonalizable as follows: 

where  is the Vandermonde matrix corresponding to the 's.

In that case, traces of powers m of   readily yield sums of the same powers m of all roots of  p(t),

If  has a non-simple root, then C(p) isn't diagonalizable (its Jordan canonical form contains one block for each distinct root).

Linear recursive sequences
Given a linear recursive sequence with characteristic polynomial

the (transpose) companion matrix

generates the sequence, in the sense that

increments the series by 1.

The vector  is an eigenvector of this matrix for eigenvalue , when   is a root of the characteristic polynomial  .

For , and all other ,  i.e.,  this matrix reduces to Sylvester's cyclic shift matrix, or circulant matrix.

From linear ODE to linear ODE system

Consider first a homogeneous system in normal form.

A linear ODE of order  for the scalar function 

can be equivalently described as a coupled linear ODE system of order 1 for the vector function 

where  is the transpose of the companion matrix for the monic polynomial . 

In the ODE setting the coefficients  may be also functions of the independent variable as well and not just scalar values. 

If  is invertible then it is possible to decouple it by making a coordinate transformation as described in the section on Diagonalizability.

For inhomogeneous case

the inhomogenity term will be become a vector function of the form 
.

See also
Frobenius endomorphism
Cayley–Hamilton theorem
Krylov subspace

Notes

Matrices
Matrix theory